Antoine Laurent Hoppenot (born 23 November 1990) is a French footballer who currently plays for Hartford Athletic in the USL Championship.

Career

College and amateur
Hoppenot played college soccer at Princeton University between 2008 and 2011. During his time at Princeton, Hoppenot was named First-Team All-Ivy in 2011, Ivy League Player of the Year, semi-finalist for the Hermann Trophy, second-team NSCAA All-America, third-team College Soccer News All-America, first-team All-Ivy and first-team All-Region in 2010, first-team All-Ivy League and third-team All-Region by the NSCAA in 2009, and second-team All-Ivy in 2008.

During his time at college, Hoppenot also played for USL Premier Development League club Central Jersey Spartans between 2010 and 2011.

Professional

Philadelphia Union
Philadelphia Union selected Hoppenot in the third round (No. 51 overall) of the 2012 MLS Supplemental Draft.

Hoppenot made his debut as a substitute during a 1–0 win against Columbus Crew on 14 April 2012.

Hoppenot was sent on loan to USL Pro club Harrisburg City Islanders on 20 April. He remained a Union player through 2015 with frequent loans to Harrisburg City.

FC Cincinnati
On 21 January 2016, Hoppenot signed with expansion side FC Cincinnati of the United Soccer League.

Reno 1868 FC
On 2 February 2017, Hoppenot signed with expansion side Reno 1868 FC of the United Soccer League. Hoppenot was released by Reno on December 3, 2018.

Tampa Bay Rowdies
On 6 December 2018, Hoppenot joined USL Championship side Tampa Bay Rowdies ahead of their 2019 season.

Louisville City FC
On 27 June 2019, Hoppenot joined Louisville City FC from the Rowdies, as part of a trade that sent Lucky Mkosana to Tampa Bay. Following the 2021 season, Louisville opted to decline their contract option on Hoppenot.

Detroit City FC
Hoppenot joined Detroit City FC in February 2022, ahead of their inaugural season in the USL Championship. Hoppenot scored Detroit City's first goal in USL Championship history, during a 1–0 victory over the Charleston Battery.

Hartford Athletic
Hoppenot signed with Hartford Athletic on December 1, 2022.

Personal
He is the son of Hervé and Anne Hoppenot. He has a younger brother Maxime, who was captain of the Tufts soccer team. He also has an older brother Pierre, who played soccer at Washington University in St. Louis and a sister Claire.

In addition to playing professionally, Hoppenot also coached soccer to players in Pennsylvania.

Hoppenot also holds United States citizenship.

Career statistics

Club

Honours

Individual
USL Championship Assists Champion: 2022

References

External links

 
 Antoine Hoppenot's biography (2016) at FC Cincinnati
 

1990 births
Living people
American soccer players
Central Jersey Spartans players
FC Cincinnati (2016–18) players
French emigrants to the United States
Major League Soccer players
Penn FC players
People from Princeton, New Jersey
Philadelphia Union draft picks
Philadelphia Union players
Princeton Tigers men's soccer players
Reno 1868 FC players
Soccer players from New Jersey
Sportspeople from Mercer County, New Jersey
Tampa Bay Rowdies players
USL Championship players
USL League Two players
Louisville City FC players
Association football midfielders
Association football forwards
Detroit City FC players
Hartford Athletic players